Boryzops torresi is a species of moth of the family Erebidae. It is found in Loja Province, Ecuador.

References

torresi
Moths described in 1889
Moths of South America
Taxa named by Paul Dognin